Nasrabad (also Romanized as Naşrābād, Nasr Abad, and Nāşerābād; also known as Naşīrābād and Nāsirābād) is a village in Lay Siyah Rural District, in the Central District of Nain County, Isfahan Province, Iran. At the 2006 census, its population was 18, in 8 families.

References 

Populated places in Nain County